The U.S. Senate Environment and Public Works Subcommittee on Subcommittee on Transportation Safety, Infrastructure Security, and Water Quality was one of six subcommittees of the U.S. Senate Committee on Environment and Public Works.

Jurisdiction
The subcommittee's jurisdiction includes:

Drinking Water, Chemical, and Wastewater Security
Clean Water Act, including wetlands
Safe Drinking Water Act
Coastal Zone Management Act
Invasive Species
Transportation Safety
Outer Continental Shelf Lands (environmental concerns)

History
The subcommittee was created in 2007 during committee organization of the 110th Congress when several areas of jurisdiction were transferred from other subcommittees, particularly the Subcommittee on Transportation and Infrastructure.

Members, 110th Congress
The subcommittee is chaired by Frank Lautenberg of New Jersey, and the Ranking Member is David Vitter of Louisiana.

References 

2007 establishments in the United States
Environment of the United States
Government agencies established in 2007
Environment and Public Works Transportation Safety, Infrastructure Security, and Water Quality